Mormon volcanic field, also known as Mormon Mountain volcanic field, is a monogenetic and polygenetic volcanic field south of Flagstaff, Arizona.

Notable Vents

See also
 List of volcanoes in the United States

References

External links
 

Volcanic fields of Arizona
Landforms of Coconino County, Arizona
Miocene volcanism
Pliocene volcanism